The Norwegian railway network consisted, as of 2008, of  of line. The Trunk Line opened as Norway's first mainline railway on 1 September 1854.

List
The following table gives a chronological overview of the mainline railway lines in Norway. It explicitly excludes tramway, light rail and metro lines, spurs and industrial lines. It contains the date the section opened, the line the segment is currently considered part of, the name of the line at the time of the opening (if different from the current name). Some railways have simply changed name, while others have been merged with other lines. The table further gives the length of the line, the gauge and number of tracks (single, double or quadruple), all at the time the line opened. Many railway lines have since been shortened and some have been doubled and been through gauge conversion. Railway which opened as private are marked, even though many were later nationalized. In later years, many new sections are major realignments, typically tunnels, which shorten an existing line.

References
Bibliography

Notes

Rail transport timelines
History of rail transport in Norway